Chathura Athukorala (born 6 July 1984) is a Sri Lankan former cricketer. He played in 34 first-class and 25 List A matches between 2004/05 and 2010/11. He made his Twenty20 debut on 17 August 2004, for Galle Cricket Club in the 2004 SLC Twenty20 Tournament. Following his career in Sri Lanka, he also played cricket in Australia.

References

External links
 

1984 births
Living people
Sri Lankan cricketers
Burgher Recreation Club cricketers
Galle Cricket Club cricketers
Nondescripts Cricket Club cricketers
Sebastianites Cricket and Athletic Club cricketers